Mount George Murray is a flat-topped, mainly ice-covered mountain rising between the heads of Davis Glacier and Harbord Glacier in the Prince Albert Mountains of Victoria Land, Antarctica. It was discovered by the British National Antarctic Expedition, 1901–04, which named it for George R.M. Murray of the British Museum, staff director of the scientific aims of Robert Falcon Scott's expedition.

References

Mountains of Victoria Land
Scott Coast
Prince Albert Mountains